Rangachari Vijayaraghavan (born 2 September 1946) is a former Indian cricket umpire. He stood in two ODI games between 1990 and 2010. He is the son of the former Indian fast bowler C. R. Rangachari.

See also
 List of One Day International cricket umpires

References

1946 births
Living people
Indian One Day International cricket umpires
Cricketers from Bangalore